The 1926 NC State Wolfpack football team was an American football team that represented North Carolina State University as a member of the Southern Conference (SoCon) during the 1926 college football season. In its third season under head coach Gus Tebell, the team compiled a 4–6 record (0–4 against SoCon opponents), finished in last place in the conference, and was outscored by a total of 102 to 66.

Schedule

References

NC State
NC State Wolfpack football seasons
NC State Wolfpack football